Linhai (Tai-chow dialect: Lin-he) is a county-level city in Taizhou, Zhejiang Province situated on the banks of the Lin River in Eastern China.

As of the 2020 census, its population was 1,114,146 inhabitants even though its built-up (or metro) area is much smaller.

Its Cathedral of the Sacred Heart of Jesus is the episcopal see of the Roman Catholic Diocese of Linhai.

History and sights 
Its wall attracts many tourists. The northern portion, along a high ridge, and the western & southern portions, along the Lin River, still exist and are in good condition.

Administrative divisions
Subdistricts:
Gucheng Subdistrict, Dayang Subdistrict, Jiangnan Subdistrict, Datian Subdistrict, Shaojiadu Subdistrict

Towns:
Xunqiao, Dongcheng, Xiaozhi, Taozhu, Shangpan, Duqiao, Yongquan, Youxi, Hetou, Yanjiang, Kuocang, Yongfeng, Huixi, Baishuiyang

Climate

References

Sources and external links 
 GCatholic - Catholic see

County-level cities in Zhejiang
Taizhou, Zhejiang